NY Persian Parade (Persian: رژه ایرانیان نیویورک) is an annual parade held in New York City, United States. The parade was founded in 2004 by a group of Iranian Americans who wanted to keep the Persian culture and traditions of their homeland, Iran, alive.

The New York Persian Parade is staged in the middle of the traditional two-week period of celebration for Nowruz, the Iranian New Year.

With the COVID-19 pandemic that caused the parade to go on hiatus in 2020, the 17th was deferred to 2022.

References

External links 
 

Asian-American culture in New York City
Iranian-American culture in New York (state)
Iranian-American organizations
Middle Eastern-American culture in New York City
Nowruz
Parades in New York City